Jeff Lipsky is an American photographer specializing in celebrity and lifestyle photography. Lipsky has photographed many well-known actors and actresses for high-profile magazines, including Elliot Page for the Los Angeles Times Magazine, Mark Wahlberg for Men's Journal, Dustin Hoffman for AARP Magazine, Jonathan Rhys Meyers for Cosmopolitan, Jeremy Renner, Harrison Ford, and Jerry Seinfeld.

Before moving from Colorado to Los Angeles to pursue photography, Lipsky worked as fly-fishing guide and snowboarder. He has carried over his love of the outdoors into his work as a photographer, having shot more than 30 stories for Outside magazine. In advertising, he has photographed campaigns for Baume & Mercier, J Brand, and MTV.

Lipsky is based in Los Angeles and is represented by foureleven.

Notes

References
Chris Orwig interviews Jeff Lipsky, A Photo Editor, August 15, 2012
“Paps Go Undercover to Snap Secret Pics of Hills Cast,” MTV Remote Control Blog, July 9, 2008
"The Hills (Season 4) Photo Shoot: Behind the Scenes," MTV.com, August 25, 2008.
“City Guide: Los Angeles,” PDN, April 2, 2009
“Jeff Lipsky,” Texas Monthly, May 2005

External links
Jeff Lipsky official site

“Since She’s Been Gone,” feature story on Kelly Clarkson in Texas Monthly, May 2005, photographed by Jeff Lipsky
“Bon Appetit Magazine Photoshoot at Kichisen,” September 26, 2009

Living people
American photographers
Year of birth missing (living people)